"Peggy Sue" is a rock and roll song written by Jerry Allison and Norman Petty, and recorded and released as a single by Buddy Holly on September 20, 1957. The Crickets are not mentioned on label of the single (Coral 9-61885), but band members Joe B. Mauldin (string bass) and Jerry Allison (drums) played on the recording. This recording was also released on Holly's eponymous 1958 album.

Production
The song was originally entitled "Cindy Lou", after Holly's niece, the daughter of his sister Pat Holley Kaiter. The title was later changed to "Peggy Sue" in reference to Peggy Sue Gerron (1940–2018), the girlfriend (and future wife) of Jerry Allison, the drummer for the Crickets, after the couple had temporarily broken up.

In her memoir, Whatever Happened to Peggy Sue?, Gerron stated that she first heard the song at a live performance at the Sacramento Memorial Auditorium in 1957, and that she was "so embarrassed, I could have died."

Appropriately, Allison had a prominent role in the production of the song, playing paradiddles on the drums throughout the song, the drums' sound rhythmically fading in and out as a result of real-time engineering techniques by the producer, Norman Petty.   Joe B. Mauldin (string bass) also played on the recording.

Initially, only Allison and Petty were listed as the song's authors. At Allison's insistence, Holly was credited as a co-writer after his death.

Reception
"Peggy Sue" went to number three on the Billboard Top 100 chart in 1957.

It is ranked number 194 on Rolling Stone magazine's 2004 list of the "500 Greatest Songs of All Time." It is ranked as the 173rd greatest song of all time and the fifth best song of 1957 by Acclaimed Music. In 1999, National Public Radio (NPR) included the song on the NPR 100, a list of the "100 Most Important American Musical Works of the 20th Century." The song was inducted into the Grammy Hall of Fame in 1999. The Rock and Roll Hall of Fame and Museum included the song on its list of the "Songs That Shaped Rock and Roll."

"Peggy Sue Got Married"
Holly wrote a sequel, "Peggy Sue Got Married", and recorded a demonstration version in his New York City apartment on December 5, 1958, accompanied only by himself on guitar. The tape was discovered after his death and was "enhanced" for commercial release, with the addition of backing vocals and an electric guitar track that drowns out Holly's playing and almost drowns out his voice. The rarely heard original version was released on a vinyl collection, The Complete Buddy Holly. It was later played over the opening credits of the 1986 Kathleen Turner film Peggy Sue Got Married.

After Holly's death, the Crickets released their own version as a single in 1960. They followed the original arrangements, with David Box, a Holly soundalike, as the lead vocalist.

Cover versions
This song has been covered many times, including by John Lennon, New Riders of the Purple Sage, The Beach Boys, The Hollies, and Waylon Jennings (who worked with Holly).

An adaptation of "Peggy Sue" entitled "Christmas Time Is Here Again" which made use of the backing track from The Beach Boys' cover version featured on their 1998 compilation album Ultimate Christmas.

Chart performance

Single

References

Sources
 Amburn, Ellis (1995). Buddy Holly: A Biography. St. Martin's Press. .
 Cott, Jonathan (1976). In The Rolling Stone Illustrated History of Rock and Roll. Rolling Stone Press, Random House. .

External links
 Buddy Holly Discography.
 Peggy Sue. 45cat.com.
 List of Holly "covered" songs, including this one
 BBC interview with Peggy Sue Gerron
 

1957 songs
1957 singles
Buddy Holly songs
Music published by MPL Music Publishing
Rockabilly songs
Songs written by Buddy Holly
Song recordings produced by Norman Petty
Songs written by Jerry Allison
Grammy Hall of Fame Award recipients
Coral Records singles
The Crickets songs